The Tanahjampea monarch or white-tipped monarch (Symposiachrus everetti) is a species of bird in the family Monarchidae.  The scientific name commemorates British colonial administrator and zoological collector Alfred Hart Everett.

Taxonomy and systematics
This species was originally described in the genus Monarcha until moved to Symposiachrus in 2009. Alternate names include Djampea monarch and Everett's monarch. Some authorities have considered the Tanahjampea monarch to be a subspecies of the Kai monarch.

Distribution and habitat
It is endemic to Indonesia's Tanah Jampea, the second largest of the Selayar Islands group in the Flores Sea.  Its natural habitats are subtropical or tropical moist lowland forest, subtropical or tropical mangrove forest and subtropical or tropical moist shrubland.  It is threatened by habitat loss.

References

External links
Image at ADW

Tanahjampea monarch
Endemic birds of Sulawesi
Tanahjampea monarch
Taxonomy articles created by Polbot